Denis Auroux (born April 1977 in Lyon) is a French mathematician working in geometry and topology.

Education and career
Auroux was admitted in 1993 to the École normale supérieure. In 1994, he received a licentiate and maîtrise in mathematics from Paris Diderot University (Paris 7). In 1995, he received a licentiate in physics from Pierre and Marie Curie University (Paris 6) and passed the agrégation. In 1995, he received a master's degree in mathematics from Paris-Sud University with a thesis on Seiberg-Witten invariants of symplectic manifolds. In 1999, he received his doctorate from the École polytechnique with supervisors Jean-Pierre Bourguignon and Mikhael Gromov for a thesis on structure theorems for compact symplectic manifolds via almost-complex techniques. In 2003, he completed his habilitation at Paris-Sud University with a thesis on approximately holomorphic techniques and monodromy invariants in symplectic topology. 

As a postdoc, he was a Moore Instructor at the Massachusetts Institute of Technology from 1999 to 2002, where he became an assistant professor in 2002, an associate professor in 2004 (tenured in 2006), and a professor in 2009 (on leave from 2009 to 2011). From 2009 to 2018, he was a professor at the University of California, Berkeley. Since Fall 2018, he has been at Harvard University, where he teaches Math 55, two-semester honors undergraduate course on algebra and analysis.

His research deals with symplectic geometry, low-dimensional topology, and mirror symmetry.

In 2002, he received the Prix Peccot from the Collège de France. In 2005, he received a Sloan Research Fellowship. He was an invited speaker in 2010 with talk Fukaya Categories and bordered Heegaard-Floer Homology at the International Congress of Mathematicians in Hyderabad and in 2004 at the European Congress of Mathematicians in Stockholm.

Selected publications

References

External links
 

1977 births
Living people
20th-century French mathematicians
21st-century French mathematicians
Paris Diderot University alumni
École Polytechnique alumni
Pierre and Marie Curie University alumni
University of California, Berkeley faculty
Harvard University faculty